In mathematics, a free boundary problem (FB problem) is a partial differential equation to be solved for both an unknown function  and an unknown domain .

FBs arise in various mathematical models encompassing applications that ranges from physical to economical, financial and biological phenomena, where there is an extra effect of the medium. This effect is in general a qualitative change of the medium and hence an appearance of a phase transition: ice to water, liquid to crystal, buying to selling (assets), active to inactive (biology), blue to red (coloring games), disorganized to organized (self-organizing criticality). An interesting aspect of such a criticality is the so-called sandpile dynamic (or Internal DLA).

The most classical example is the melting of ice: Given a block of ice, one can solve the heat equation given appropriate initial and boundary conditions to determine its temperature. But, if in any region the temperature is greater than the melting point of ice, this domain will be occupied by liquid water instead. The boundary formed from the ice/liquid interface is controlled dynamically by the solution of the PDE.

Two-phase Stefan problems 
The melting of ice is a Stefan problem for the temperature field , which is formulated as follows. Consider a medium occupying a region  consisting of two phases, phase 1 which is present when  and phase 2 which is present when . For example, the thermal diffusivity of water is 1.4×10−7 m2/s, while the diffusivity of ice is 1.335×10−6 m2/s.

In the regions consisting solely of one phase, the temperature is determined by the heat equation: in the region ,
 
while in the region ,
 

Let  be the surface where  at time ; this surface is the interface between the two phases. Let  denote the unit outward normal vector to the second (solid) phase. The Stefan condition determines the evolution of the surface  by giving an equation governing the velocity  of the free surface in the direction , specifically
 
where  is the latent heat of melting. By  we mean the limit of the gradient as  approaches  from the region , and for  we mean the limit of the gradient as  approaches  from the region .

In this problem, we know beforehand the whole region  but we only know the ice-liquid interface  at time . To solve the Stefan problem we not only have to solve the heat equation in each region, but we must also track the free boundary .

In the direction of greater complexity we could also consider problems with an arbitrary number of phases.

Obstacle problems 

Another famous free-boundary problem is the obstacle problem, which bears close connections to the classical Poisson equation. The solutions of the differential equation

satisfy a variational principle, that is to say they minimize the functional

over all functions  taking the value  on the boundary. In the obstacle problem, we impose an additional constraint: we minimize the functional  subject to the condition

Define the coincidence set C as the region where . Then  satisfies the free boundary problem

Note that the set of all functions  such that   is convex. Where the Poisson problem corresponds to minimization of a quadratic functional over a linear subspace of functions, the free boundary problem corresponds to minimization over a convex set.

Connection with variational inequalities 

Many free boundary problems can profitably be viewed as variational inequalities for the sake of analysis. To illustrate this point, we first turn to the minimization of a function  of  real variables over a convex set ; the minimizer  is characterized by the condition

The same idea applies to the minimization of a differentiable functional  on a convex subset of a Hilbert space, where the gradient is now interpreted as a variational derivative. To concretize this idea, we apply it to the obstacle problem, which can be written as

This formulation permits the definition of a weak solution: using integration by parts on the last equation gives that

This definition only requires that  have one derivative, in much the same way as the weak formulation of elliptic boundary value problems.

Regularity of free boundaries 

In the theory of elliptic partial differential equations, one demonstrates the existence of a weak solution of a differential equation with reasonable ease using some functional analysis arguments. One then applies some calculus estimates to demonstrate that the weak solution is in fact sufficiently regular.

For free boundary problems, this task is more formidable for two reasons. For one, the solutions often exhibit discontinuous derivatives across the free boundary, while they may be analytic in any neighborhood away from it. Secondly, one must also demonstrate the regularity of the free boundary itself. For example, for the Stefan problem, the free boundary is a  surface.

Related Problems

From a purely academic point of view free boundaries belong to a larger class of problems usually referred to as overdetermined problems, or as David Kinderlehrer and Guido Stampacchia addressed it in their book: The problem of matching Cauchy data. Other related FBP that can be mentioned are Pompeiu problem, Schiffer’s conjectures. See the external links below.

Another approach used to model similar problems is the Phase-field model.

References 

     The Matching Problem in PDE,
   The Pompeiu problem,
    Schiffer's conjecture,

Partial differential equations
Boundary value problems